Franciszek Zajerski (died 1631) was a Roman Catholic prelate who served as Auxiliary Bishop of Lutsk (1622–1631) and Titular Bishop of Argos (1622–1631).

Biography
On 21 Feb 1622, Franciszek Zajerski was appointed during the papacy of Pope Gregory XV as Auxiliary Bishop of Lutsk and Titular Bishop of Argos. On 9 Oct 1622, he was consecrated bishop by Paweł Wołucki, Bishop of Włocławek, with Baltazar Miaskowski, Titular Bishop of Margarita, and Stanislaw Starczewski, Titular Bishop of Lacedaemonia, serving as co-consecrators.  He served as Auxiliary Bishop of Lutsk until his death in 1631.

See also 
Catholic Church in Ukraine

References

External links and additional sources
 (for Chronology of Bishops) 
 (for Chronology of Bishops)  
 (for Chronology of Bishops) 
 (for Chronology of Bishops)  

17th-century Roman Catholic bishops in the Polish–Lithuanian Commonwealth
Bishops appointed by Pope Gregory XV
1631 deaths